Phidippus borealis, the boreal tufted jumping spider, is a species of jumping spider which occurs in Canada and the northern United States.

References

Platnick: The World Spider Catalog - Salticidae

External links
Tree of Life Web Project

Salticidae
Spiders of North America
Spiders described in 1895